form Japan's largest immigrant group from a Muslim-majority country. , Japanese government figures recorded 83,169 legal residents of Indonesian nationality.

Demography and distribution
Indonesians in Japan tend to be younger than other Muslim migrants; 64.5% of legal residents are recorded to be between 20 and 30 years old, whereas the majority of the other large Muslim migrant groups (Iranians, Bangladeshis, and Pakistanis) are between 30 and 40 years old. 37% of legal residents live in the Kantō region, a much smaller proportion than for other Muslim migrants; that includes 2,175 people in Tokyo itself, 1,236 in Saitama, 1,204 in Ibaraki, 1,002 in Kanagawa, 845 in Chiba, 519 in Gunma, and 244 in Tochigi. The Keihanshin area and the Chūkyō Metropolitan Area, each have roughly 10% of Japan's Indonesian population; a further 6% can be found in both Nagano Prefecture and Shizuoka Prefecture. The remainder are scattered throughout the other prefectures, with between 30 and 500 in each one.

Since 1998 the chief of a factory association in Oarai has invited Japanese descendants and migrants from North Sulawesi to work for seafood industries. A majority of the Indonesians inhabitants were later arrested for being undocumented.

Education

The Tokyo Republic of Indonesia School, an Indonesian international school, is in Tokyo.

Notable people
 Ricky Yacobi
 Ken Soetanto - inventor of the Soetanto Effect
 Lisa Halim
 Vanina Amalia Hidayat - Wife of Dean Fujioka
 Hana Kimura
 Dewi Sukarno - Wife of Sukarno
 Hary Gunarto - Professor - Scientist/Engineer

See also
 Indonesia–Japan relations
 Overseas Indonesian
 Japanese migration to Indonesia

References

Citations

Sources

Further reading
 
 
 
 
 

Ethnic groups in Japan
Japan